Hypericum lycium is a species of flowering plant in the family Hypericaceae which is endemic to Turkey.

References

lycium
Flora of Turkey
Endemic flora of Turkey